William John Williams (born 3 October 1960) is an English former professional footballer who played as a centre-back. He made 415 league and cup appearances in a 15-year career in the English Football League, scoring 27 goals.

He began his career at Tranmere Rovers, playing 201 games in all competitions between 1978 and July 1985, when he made a £12,000 move to Port Vale. He helped the "Valiants" to promotion out of the Fourth Division in 1985–86, before being sold on to Bournemouth for £30,000 in December 1986. He helped the "Cherries" to the Third Division championship in 1986–87, before moving on to Cardiff City in 1991, following a loan spell at Wigan Athletic. Cardiff won the Third Division title in 1992–93, after which he returned to Bournemouth as a coach. He served the club as caretaker-manager in August 1994.

Playing career

Tranmere Rovers
After playing as an amateur Williams signed for Tranmere Rovers in 1979 under the stewardship of John King. However, he established himself as a regular under Bryan Hamilton during the 1980–81 season, as the club were forced to apply for re-election. They rose to 11th in 1981–82, dropping to 19th in 1982–83, two places and one point above the re-election zone. The "Superwhites" rose to 10th in 1983–84, before a sixth-place finish in 1984–85, two places and nine points behind promoted Bury. He played a total of 201 league and cup games during his time at Prenton Park, scoring 13 goals.

Port Vale
In July 1985, Port Vale paid £12,000 to secure his services. He played regularly during the club's 1985–86 Fourth Division promotion campaign, scoring three goals in 44 appearances. However, he lost his form the following season, playing 18 games at Vale Park, before being sold to Bournemouth for £30,000 in December 1986. where he became a popular player with the club's fans.

Bournemouth
In 2008, Harry Redknapp described him as possibly the best signing he had made in his 25-year management career. Williams later recalled how he was reluctant to leave Port Vale as he had just purchased a house in Holmes Chapel and was settled, but Redknapp convinced Williams and his wife to move to Bournemouth despite only offering a weekly wage rise of £50; Williams said "I signed because I liked Harry". Under Redknapp's leadership, the "Cherries" won the Third Division championship in 1986–87 with 97 points. They retained their Second Division status in 1987–88 with a 17th-place finish, before the Dean Court side finished 12th in 1988–89, only to suffer relegation in 1989–90 after finishing two points behind the safety mark set by Middlesbrough. Bournemouth finished ninth in 1990–91, finishing two places and six points outside the play-offs. In the spring of 1991 he went to Norwegian top-flight club Strømsgodset, but only played once as a substitute. He played four games for former manager Bryan Hamilton on loan at Wigan Athletic.

Cardiff City
Williams signed with Cardiff City in 1991. He remained at Ninian Park for 1991–92 and 1992–93, helping Eddie May's "Bluebirds" to the Third Division title in 1993. However, he was never a regular in the first team, making just six league appearances. He then returned to Bournemouth as a member of the coaching staff. He worked for Bournemouth as their community development officer and later assistant manager. He served as caretaker manager in August 1994, between the terms of Tony Pulis and Mel Machin.

Post-retirement
By November 2008, Williams was working for BBC Radio Solent as a summariser and co-commentator for Bournemouth matches.

Career statistics

Managerial statistics
Source:

Honours
Port Vale
Football League Fourth Division fourth-place promotion: 1985–86

Bournemouth
Football League Third Division: 1986–87

Cardiff City
Football League Third Division: 1992–93

References

1960 births
Living people
Footballers from Liverpool
English footballers
Association football defenders
Tranmere Rovers F.C. players
Port Vale F.C. players
AFC Bournemouth players
Strømsgodset Toppfotball players
Wigan Athletic F.C. players
Cardiff City F.C. players
English Football League players
Eliteserien players
English expatriate footballers
Expatriate footballers in Norway
English expatriate sportspeople in Norway
English football managers
AFC Bournemouth managers
English Football League managers
Association football coaches
AFC Bournemouth non-playing staff
English association football commentators